Bandhan Saat Janamon Ka (English: Binding Of Seven Lives) is an Indian television series which premiered on Colors TV on 21 July 2008.

Plot
The story is of an intelligent, mature, simple girl who marries, but experiences dowry worries. First of all, she completes her dream marriage between her and Parth, when the Gupta family confront the Agarwal family about arranging 2.5 million for the release of their son Parth who was allegedly in prison. Unfortunately, in greed of money the Gupta family consistently started to harass Trilok Agarwal (Janvi's father), to arrange for the 2.5 million. Their demand began to begin a burden for Janvi's father, and he tried to sell Manohar's side of his house for rent, (which he agreed for), but Shobhna (Janvi's aunt), refused her side of the house to be sold. This made Janvi's father suffer even more, and becoming more prone to asthma attacks, had finally found the truth about the Gupta family, that they were money-hungry, and would maltreat Janvi to make Janvi's father pay up his debt as quick as possible. Whilst this was taking place, Janvi was locked in the dark storeroom to wake up early in the morning to do morning chores. She was constantly harassed in her room, with people trying to scare her. Finally at his limit, he died of an asthma attack after Shobhna had gone over a daily row over spending and doling out costs.

Janvi's father had his funeral and Janvi was given excuses that she could'tn attend the funeral. Nikita gave her false hopes and said she would take her to the hospital to meet her father, when he had already met his demise. Janvi went to the temple to offer flowers to Mata Durga's idol while Nikita stood beside her, putting on an evil smile on her face. After that, Janvi noticed her father's corpse wrapped up in the white cloth and immediately recognised her family surrounding the corpse. She rushed over, with Nikita persistently trying to push her back, and then she drove off in the car, leaving Janvi alone to see her father.

Seema tells the truth of Devang's condition. She said that Devang's wife, Ritu, was burned alive because of dowry worries for the Dahejj. Devang was so unhappy, that he then went under a mental condition. His parents and family gave him medicine injections that would just worsen his condition, never to make it cure.

Janvi reached home to find that she was being put through abuse and neglect. She was subjected all sorts of abuse whilst with the family.

Cast
 Gungun Uprari as Janvi Agarwal and Janvi Parth Gupta
 Vishal Gandhi as Parth Gupta
 Anuj Thakur as Ayush 
 Vandana Gupte as Kamini 
 Ansha Sayed as Nikita Gupta
 Shailesh Datar as Trilok Agarwal 
 Dhruv Lather as Devang
 Shahnawaz Pradhan

References

External links
Official Site on IMDb.com
Bandhan Saat Janamon Ka News Article on DeccanHerald.com

Colors TV original programming
Indian drama television series
2008 Indian television series debuts
2009 Indian television series endings